"Repilot" is the first episode of the fifth season of Community, and the 85th episode overall in the series. It originally aired on January 2, 2014 on NBC; and was written by series creator Dan Harmon (after he was re-hired to run season 5) and Chris McKenna and directed by Tristram Shapeero. This is the final episode of the series to feature Chevy Chase as Pierce Hawthorne, making a cameo appearance following his departure in season 4.

In this episode, Jeff Winger (Joel McHale) returns to Greendale one year after graduation to research a potential lawsuit after his practice goes under. While doing this, he finds out what has happened to his friends within the study group since his departure.

The episode received positive reviews, with many critics noting showrunner Dan Harmon's return to the series after his absence from the fourth season; and 3.49 million viewers watched this episode and the following episode "Introduction to Teaching."

Plot
One year after the events of "Advanced Introduction to Finality", Jeff Winger's new law firm has failed.  His former colleague Alan Connor (Rob Corddry) alerts Jeff to a potential new lawsuit against his former school, Greendale Community College.  The two form a begrudging alliance, plotting on having Jeff infiltrate the school and obtain files that would assist them in the lawsuit against Greendale.

After meeting briefly with Dean Pelton (Jim Rash) while looking for the files he needs for his case, Jeff is re-united with his former study-group, including Annie Edison (Alison Brie), Shirley Bennett (Yvette Nicole Brown), Britta Perry (Gillian Jacobs), Troy Barnes (Donald Glover) and Abed Nadir (Danny Pudi), and convinces them that he is working on a way to save the college from the lawsuit.  He uses this as a ruse to find out all of the negative things that have happened to each of the study-group members after they graduated (including Shirley's family leaving her due to her business, Britta ending up as a bartender, Annie becoming a drug rep, and Abed's film degree going nowhere); information he plans on using to convince them all to start their own lawsuits against Greendale. Jeff double-crosses Connor, and decides to pursue these new lawsuits on his own.  However, Connor alerts the study-group of Jeff's intent.  After a confrontation, Jeff is able to manipulate the group into going through with the lawsuit anyway.

Jeff soon comes to regret this decision, and after happening upon a holographic projection of Pierce Hawthorne (Chevy Chase) in the school's courtyard, speaks with Dean Pelton.  Pelton, realizing Jeff is in financial ruin, offers to hire him as a new teacher, to which Jeff reluctantly agrees.  Jeff re-unites with the study group and convinces them to drop their lawsuit.  They all decide to re-enroll at Greendale and pursue new majors.

Production
This is the first episode to feature the return of series creator Dan Harmon as showrunner following his season long absence from production. Harmon co-wrote the episode with Chris McKenna, who also returned to the show and was promoted to executive producer this season. The episode was directed by executive producer Tristram Shapeero.

The episode features a guest appearance by Chevy Chase, who left the show as a main cast member during production of season 4. Harmon thought Pierce's character was needed to convince Jeff to save Greendale at the point in the episode where he was conflicted. As part of his departure agreement, he was not permitted to return to the set, which Harmon had to work around as a constraint. Chase was filmed with a motion-control camera on a different set. To keep the appearance hidden, the crew were only informed if they needed to work on it, and the table read featured an alternate scene in which Jeff meets Star-Burns. The season 3 finale "Introduction to Finality" revealed that Star-Burns faked his death, and the alternate "Repilot" scene saw him telling Jeff he was hiding on campus, despite it being the worst hiding place, because there was something special about Greendale. "Basic Intergluteal Numismatics" later saw his canonical return.

Cultural references
Throughout the episode, Abed related the potential reboot of the study group to the ninth season of the medical comedy-drama series Scrubs; Troy reacts angrily on learning the protagonist John "J.D." Dorian (Zach Braff) does not appear in the last four episodes of said season, obliquely referring to Donald Glover's upcoming departure from Community. The end of the episode has the familiar Scrubs voiceover (by Braff) summing up the feelings of the characters over a montage of their activities. It later pans out to reveal Abed showing the study group an episode of Scrubs season 9.

Reception

Ratings
This episode and "Introduction to Teaching" was watched by 3.49 million American viewers, and received an 18–49 rating/share of 1.3/4. The show placed second in its timeslot and sixth for the night.

Including DVR viewing, this and the second episode was viewed by 4.33 million viewers, and received an 18–49 rating of 1.8.

Critical reception
The premiere has received generally positive reviews from critics, with most noting Dan Harmon's return to the series. Morgan Glennon of Buddy TV gave the premiere a positive review, noting the show's change from the fourth season, saying "A lot has changed between seasons in the lives of our characters, yet the biggest change is in the writing for the show. Even in the best episodes last year, like "Intro to Felt Surrogacy," things still felt just slightly left of center. With Harmon's return, it feels like the ship has been righted back on course and the soul has returned to the proceedings."

Verne Gay of Newsday graded the episode an A, commenting positively on Dan Harmon's return and creativity, saying "the non-sequiturs, word play, pop culture refs and absolute disdain for anything bordering on sitcom logic are all part of a mad dash through the mind of Harmon, and past all of the stuff he finds so gloriously idiotic."

Gabrielle Moss of TV Fanatic gave the premiere a 4.8 out of 5, saying "The new season of Community is, thus far, brutally funny and also pretty damned brutal – from Jeff Winger's failure as a legitimate lawyer, to everyone's similarly bleak post-Greendale trajectories (Relaxarex!). [...] The show has always pulled no punches about the bleakness of the gang's lives (and life in general), but the darkness was especially notable, [...] with only a few dim sources of real hope. Just like real life!" Eric Goldman of IGN gave the episode a rating of 8.5 out of 10, signaling generally positive reviews, saying "I’m elated to say that “Repilot” is just the beginning of even better things to come for a show that has been able to successfully rebound in a way few others could pull off."

Matt Zoller Seitz of Vulture commented positively on the show's sense of change, saying "Throughout, there’s a sense that Community is building, or rebuilding, toward something big and bold—that what you’re seeing is not so much a revamp as a restoration. Few live-action sitcoms are so aware of their artificiality and yet so singularly alive."

David Hinckley of the Daily News gave the episode a more moderate review, giving it a 3 out of 5. He said "And while it’s too early to tell for sure, Harmon does seem to have brought back some of the show’s earlier spirit. What he’s not doing is making an overt bid for any new, broader audience. Community seems quite happy to party with the friends it already has. And why not? Community fans may be modest in number, but their loyalty, or something, has convinced NBC to keep renewing the show long after by all normal standards it should have flunked out. So Harmon and company may think they’re in bonus time anyhow, and they might as well do what they want until someone shuts off the camera."

References

External links
 "Repilot" at NBC.com
 

2014 American television episodes
Community (season 5) episodes
Television episodes written by Dan Harmon